Council elections were held in Barbuda on March 29, 2021. The elections were won by the Barbuda People's Movement. Voter turnout was 64%.

Results

By candidate and polling station

References 

Elections in Antigua and Barbuda
Barbuda
2021 in Antigua and Barbuda
Barbuda
Landslide victories